Austrolebias arachan is a species of killifish from the family Rivulidae. It has only been recorded from Uruguay. This species was described in 2004 with the type locality given as a pond in Cerro Largo province, the specific name being a reference the natives of that province, the Arachán.

References

arachan
Fish described in 1984